Lamprechtsofen (also called Lamprechtshöhle, Lamprechtsofenhöhle or, together with a connected cave, Lamprechtsofen-Vogelschacht) is a limestone karst river cave in Austria. Before the discovery of the Krubera Cave in Georgia, it was the deepest-known cave in the world.

History

Early history 
The cave has been known for centuries. In 1701 it was walled up to prevent the intrusion of treasure seekers, who were lured to the cave by legends of wealth hidden by a knight named Lamprecht after the Crusades.

In 1905, several human skeletons were found in the cave, probably the remains of treasure hunters. At the same time, a  portion of the cave was opened to the public as a show cave.

Exploration and depth record 
The exploration of Lamprechtsofen has been primarily conducted from the bottom (from the resurgence of its cave river), rather than the top-down exploration typical for vertical caves.

As of 2014, Lamprechtsofen is the fourth-deepest cave in the world, as two more Georgian caves have since been discovered to be deeper.
On August 14, 2018 a Polish expedition connects the CL3 chasm to the Lamprechtsofen allowing the cavity to reach the depth of 1735 m.

Show cave 

Because of the cave's river, it is subject to flooding from heavy rain and melting snow. As such, visitors and explorers have been occasionally trapped in the cave.

See also 
 List of caves
 Speleology
 List of deepest caves

References

External links 

 Photo set of Lamprechtsofen
 Lamprechtsofen at troglophil.de

Caves of Austria
Loferer and Leoganger Steinberge
Zell am See District
Limestone caves
Show caves in Austria